Derek Roche (born 19 July 1972) is an Irish former professional boxer who competed from 1994 to 2004. He challenged once for the IBO super welterweight title in 2000. At regional level, he held the British welterweight title from 1999 to 2000.

Roche turned professional in September 1994, winning his first fight in Bradford, West Yorkshire, England, in which Roche knocked out Doncaster southpaw  Michael Alexander in the final round of a six-round fight on the undercard of a card that included Terrace Gaskin.

Roche lived and fought out of Leeds in England for the majority of his professional career.

Roach was undefeated in 22 fights, until he fought Harry Dhami in 2000 who took the title and the undefeated record off him, and also knocked him down 5 times.

See also
 List of British welterweight boxing champions

References

External links
 

1972 births
Sportspeople from County Wexford
Living people
Irish male boxers
Welterweight boxers